Sir Leonard Vincent Appleyard  (2 September 1938 – 7 February 2020) was a British diplomat.

Education
Born in 1938, Appleyard was educated at The Read School, an independent school for boys (now co-educational) in the village of Drax in North Yorkshire, followed by Queens' College at the University of Cambridge, from which he gained a degree (with Honours) in Classical Chinese. He spoke Mandarin, Russian, Hungarian and French.

Career
Appleyard served at the British Embassy in the People's Republic of China between 1966 and 1968 (during the country's Cultural Revolution). He served as First Secretary in the British High Commission in India from 1971 to 1974, and later returned to China as ambassador in 1994 until 1997, a period which witnessed the Taiwan Strait Crisis (1995–96) and also the 'handover' of Hong Kong from UK rule to the People's Republic of China.

Appleyard also served as the UK's ambassador to Hungary, in the Treasury, in the Cabinet Office as Deputy Cabinet Secretary, as Secretary of the Gulf War Cabinet, and as Financial Counsellor in Paris.

Following his departure from the diplomatic service, Appleyard took up a position as vice-chairman of Barclays Capital.

Appleyard also served as joint-Chairman on the Nuffield Languages Programme Steering Group along with Sir Trevor McDonald.

He was Pro-Chancellor of Bournemouth University.

He died on 7 February 2020 at the age of 81.

References

Alumni of Queens' College, Cambridge
Ambassadors of the United Kingdom to Hungary
Members of HM Diplomatic Service
Ambassadors of the United Kingdom to China
Knights Commander of the Order of St Michael and St George
People associated with Bournemouth University
1938 births
2020 deaths
Principal Private Secretaries to the Secretary of State for Foreign and Commonwealth Affairs
20th-century British diplomats